The 2010 Asian Taekwondo Championships were the 19th edition of the Asian Taekwondo Championships, and were held in Astana, Kazakhstan from May 21 to May 23, 2010.

Medal summary

Men

Women

Medal table

Team ranking

Men

Women

References
 Results

External links
 www.wtf.org

Asian Championships
Asian Taekwondo Championships
Asian Taekwondo Championships
Taekwondo Championships